Terence Pinto (born 12 September 1989) is a French professional footballer who plays as a defender for Championnat National 3 club Libourne.

Career
Pinto played on the professional level in Ligue 2 for Libourne, making his debut as a second-half substitute on 12 May 2008 in the 2–5 defeat against Amiens.

References

1989 births
Living people
Association football defenders
Sportspeople from Pau, Pyrénées-Atlantiques
French footballers
French expatriate footballers
Ligue 2 players
Championnat National 2 players
Championnat National 3 players
Challenger Pro League players
FC Libourne players
K.V. Oostende players
UR La Louvière Centre players
Bergerac Périgord FC players
French expatriate sportspeople in Belgium
Expatriate footballers in Belgium
Footballers from Nouvelle-Aquitaine